The following lists events that happened in 1959 in Iceland.

Incumbents
President – Ásgeir Ásgeirsson
Prime Minister – Emil Jónsson, Ólafur Thors

Events

Herjólfur I was built

Births

1 February – Ómar Torfason, footballer
21 April – Lúðvík Geirsson, politician.
18 February – Hallgrímur Helgason, painter, novelist, translator, and columnist
19 June – Örn Árnason, actor, comedian and screenwriter
27 June – Pétur Pétursson, footballer
4 July – Eiríkur Hauksson, heavy metal vocalist
7 September – Alfreð Gíslason, handball player and coach

Full date missing
Elsa Waage, opera singer

Deaths

Full date missing
Kristín Jónsdóttir, painter (b. 1888)

References

 
1950s in Iceland
Iceland
Iceland
Years of the 20th century in Iceland